The St. Simeon’s Collegiate Church [German:  Simeonstift] was a collegiate church in Trier, Germany, near the Roman city gate of the Porta Nigra [Latin, “Black Gate”]. Named after the Greek monk, St. Simeon of Trier, it is now a city museum in the former collegiate church’s buildings under the name, Stadtmuseum Simeonstift [City Museum of the Simeonstift].

The church was created in 1037.  In 1028 Simeon of Trier settled at the Porta Nigra as a hermit. He was supposed to have walled himself up there at the gate’s east tower.  After his death on 1 June 1035, he was buried in his room on the ground floor. In the same year, probably for Christmas, he was canonized by Pope Benedict IX, in one of the first canonizations ever made by a Pope.  In honor of the new saint, they built the Simeonstift and converted the former tower to a Doppelkirche [German, “twin church”].  The Archbishop of Trier at that time, Poppo von Babenberg, personally had known the hermit and travelled with him.  But a certificate of incorporation of the Simeonstift could not be obtained from him and it was probably never given.  However, recent research showed that the church was founded soon after the canonization of Simeon.

The Simeonstift was a two-story cloister in four wings with a dormitory in the north wing and a refectory in the west wing.  According to the dendrochronological findings, the north wing dates from 1040. The first reliable documentation is a document of 1048, which proves the existence of a provost’s office and therefore the existence of a collegiate church’s charter.

Emperor Henry IV in 1098 confirmed all his possessions to the Simeonstift and granted, namely, more than sixty properties and privileges to it.

The doppelkirche conversion of the Porta Nigra was reversed more than 750 years later, in 1804, by the order of Napoleon.  Since then, the city gate has reverted almost to its original Gallo-Roman condition.  Only the Romanesque east side of the choir still testifies from the outside to the fact that the Porta Nigra was once an imposing church.

References

External links
 (de, fr) Official Website of the Museum Simeonstift Trier

Buildings and structures in Trier
Museums in Trier
Religion in Trier